Mario Gutierrez (born  1987) is a Mexican Thoroughbred horse racing jockey who won the 2012 Santa Anita Derby, Kentucky Derby and Preakness Stakes aboard I'll Have Another, a colt owned by Windsor, Ontario, native J. Paul Reddam and his wife, Zillah. He also won the 2016 Kentucky Derby aboard Nyquist, also owned by Reddam and trained by Doug O'Neill.

Biography
The son of a jockey, Gutierrez rode Quarter Horses in his native El Higo, Veracruz, and in Mexico City beginning at age 14. In 2006 he emigrated to Canada where he began riding at Hastings Racecourse in Vancouver, British Columbia, and where he won riding titles in 2007 and 2008.

In 2012 he rode I'll Have Another and won the February 4 Robert B. Lewis Stakes at Santa Anita Park in Arcadia, California. The pair followed up with a win in the April 7 Santa Anita Derby, and on May 5, 2012, in what then retired U.S. Racing Hall of Fame jockey and NBC race commentor Gary Stevens called a "masterful ride," won the Kentucky Derby.

It was the Derby debut for the 25-year-old jockey. After the race, Gutierrez described I'll Have Another as "an amazing horse", and said that "from the first time I met him, I knew he was the one."

Year-end charts

References

1987 births
Living people
Mexican jockeys
Canadian jockeys
Mexican emigrants to Canada
Sportspeople from Vancouver
Sportspeople from Veracruz